Earl C. Haag (born June 24, 1929) is a major American scholar and author in the Pennsylvania German language. His dialect pseudonym is Der Alt Professor. Haag was graduated from the University of Connecticut (1952) and attended the University of Heidelberg and Penn State. He was a professor of German at the Penn State Schuylkill County campus. Haag's newspaper column in the dialect, Es Neinuhr Schtick, has been in continuous publication since April 5, 1984.

Bibliography
A Pennsylvania German Anthology (1988) 
A Pennsylvania German Reader and Grammar (1982, 1985, 1997) 
En Pennsylvaanisch Deitsch Yaahr: A Pennsylvania Dutch Year (1990)
The First One Hundred Years: An Index of Publications of the Pennsylvania German Society (1891-1990) Including the Yearbooks of the Pennsylvania German Folklore Society (1936-1966) (1998) 
Die Pennsylvaanisch Deitsche: The Pennsylvania Germans
volume one (2010) 
volume two (2017) Der Schtruwwelpitter gschpassiche Gschichde un lecherliche Pickders (Tintenfaß, 2010) 
William Keel and C. Richard Beam, editors, The Language and Culture of the Pennsylvania Germans: a Festschrift for Earl C. Haag (2010)Pennsylvaanisch Deitsch Schtoris: Pennsylvania Dutch Stories'' (2016)

External links
Columns from the Pennsylvania German Society
Your PA Dutch Minute: Earl C. Haag from Douglas Madenford

1929 births
Living people
Poets from Pennsylvania
German-American history
Pennsylvania Dutch people
American writers in Pennsylvania Dutch
Pennsylvania Dutch culture
German language in the United States
Linguists from the United States